Oscar Rodolfo Leguizamón (born 30 March 1966) is an Argentine former professional footballer who played as a defender.

Career
Central Córdoba of Primera B Nacional were Leguizamón's first club, he made sixty-one appearances with them between 1987 and 1989. Spells with fellow second tier teams Belgrano and Deportivo Maipú followed, prior to Leguizamón joining Argentine Primera División side Unión Santa Fe. He played twenty-three times in Argentina's professional top-flight during 1991–92, a season that ended in relegation. Leguizamón scored twenty goals in thirty-six games back in Primera B Nacional, that led to him leaving Argentine football for the first time as he left to join Chilean Primera División team Deportes Antofagasta in 1994.

He suffered relegation in his final season, 1997, with Antofagasta before returning to Argentina to join his final club, Justo Jose de Urquiza of Primera C.

Personal life
He is the father of current footballer Nicolás Leguizamón.

References

External links

1966 births
Living people
Footballers from Rosario, Santa Fe
Argentine footballers
Association football defenders
Argentine expatriate footballers
Argentine expatriate sportspeople in Chile
Expatriate footballers in Chile
Primera Nacional players
Argentine Primera División players
Primera C Metropolitana players
Central Córdoba de Santiago del Estero footballers
Club Atlético Belgrano footballers
Deportivo Maipú players
Unión de Santa Fe footballers
C.D. Antofagasta footballers
Asociación Social y Deportiva Justo José de Urquiza players